Brian Farber (born April 15, 1982 in Sandpoint, Idaho) is an American soccer player who plays as a midfielder for the San Diego Sockers in the Major Arena Soccer League.

Career

College
Farber won the Idaho State Soccer Player of the Year award in 2000 before playing college soccer at North Idaho College, where he remains the school's career record-holder for points. He transferred to Oregon State University for his final two collegiate seasons. Farber was named to the All-Pac-10 second team and Pac-10 All-Academic team as a senior in 2004.

Professional
Farber's career started in indoor soccer, having played with the Stockton Cougars and its predecessor, the California Cougars, in the Major Indoor Soccer League and the Professional Arena Soccer League since 2005. He is the franchise record holder for goals (110), points (175), and games played (105) for the Cougars franchise. He also had 55 assists. He earned MVP of the PASL in 2008.

After playing several games in the MLS Reserve Division with the reserve teams of both San Jose Earthquakes and Houston Dynamo between 2004 and 2006, Farber was offer a contract from houston dynamo. His rights were not released from his indoor team. Farbers outdoor career then went in 2007 to the Minnesota Thunder Minnesota Thunder of the USL First Division. Farber played 28 matches for Thunder, finished the season as the team's leading scorer with seven goals and leader in assists with four, and was named to the USL First Division All-League second team. He led the team in minutes played as well.

Farber signed with the Portland Timbers in January 2009. His first year with the Timbers he scored 14 points with 5 goals and 4 assists, and adding 1 goal and 3 assists in the Lamar Hunt U.S. Open Cup helping the Timbers to the Quarter Finals. Farber scored the first goal of the campaign for the Portland Timbers in his first appearance in 2008.

On March 7, 2011, Farber signed with Carolina RailHawks of the North American Soccer League.  He then moved to the San Diego Sockers of the Professional Arena Soccer League. Injuries limited him to only four games in his first season with the Sockers.  However, during the 2011–12 season, he scored twenty-seven goals in sixteen games. He is a key member of the Sockers during their 2012–13 and 2013–14 seasons as well. The PASL named Farber its Player of the Week on January 7, 2014.

Honors

Portland Timbers
 USL First Division Commissioner's Cup: 2009

References

External links
 

1982 births
Living people
American soccer players
Association football midfielders
Minnesota Thunder players
Oregon State Beavers men's soccer players
Portland Timbers (2001–2010) players
North Carolina FC players
Orange County SC players
USL First Division players
USSF Division 2 Professional League players
North American Soccer League players
USL Championship players
People from Sandpoint, Idaho
Soccer players from Idaho
Major Arena Soccer League players
San Diego Sockers players